The 1926 Tennessee gubernatorial election was held on November 2, 1926. Incumbent Democrat Austin Peay defeated Republican nominee Walter White with 64.69% of the vote.

Primary elections
Primary elections were held on August 5, 1926.

Democratic primary

Candidates
Austin Peay, incumbent Governor
Hill McAlister, Tennessee State Treasurer
John Randolph Neal Jr., attorney

Results

General election

Candidates
Major party candidates
Austin Peay, Democratic
Walter White, Republican

Results

References

Works cited
 

1926
Tennessee
Gubernatorial